Honeymoon  is a 1992 Hindi-language Romance film written by Ranbir Pushp and Kader Khan, produced and directed by Surendra Mohan. The film was the remake of the 1988 Marathi film Kiss Bai Kiss. The film received mixed reviews.

Cast
 Rishi Kapoor as Suraj Verma
 Ashwini Bhave as Lata
 Varsha Usgaonkar as Asha S. Verma
 Mohnish Bahl as Vijay
 Kader Khan as Dhaniram
 Bindu as Mrs. Dhaniram
 Dinesh Hingoo as Servant
 Shakti Kapoor as Dr. Nainsukh

Music
All songs from the film were composed by Anand–Milind.
"Yun Na Dekho Tasveer" - Suresh Wadkar, Anuradha Paudwal
"Tu Neendon Ki Rani Aur" - Udit Narayan, Anuradha Paudwal
"Ghanti Bajaye Gulfam" - Sudesh Bhosale, Sapna Mukherjee
"Suniye Janaab" - Abhijeet Bhattacharya, Sadhana Sargam
"Shaadi Ki Hai Humko" - Abhijeet Bhattacharya, Sadhana Sargam
"Main Aurat Tu Aadmi" - Mohammed Aziz, Kavita Krishnamurthy
"Aadha Tera Dil" - Amit Kumar, Anuradha Paudwal

External links

References

1990s Hindi-language films
Films scored by Anand–Milind
Indian romantic comedy films
Hindi remakes of Marathi films
Films directed by Surendra Mohan